Chaupimaquito (possibly from Quechua chawpi central, middle, makitu an additional sleeve which Andean women and men put on in some cold regions, "central makitu") is a mountain in the Vilcanota mountain range in the Andes of Peru, about  high. It is located in the Cusco Region, Canchis Province, Pitumarca District, east of Sibinacocha. It lies southeast of Condoriquiña and west of Pucasalla.

References

Mountains of Cusco Region
Mountains of Peru